Pajonal is a corregimiento in Penonomé District, Coclé Province, Panama.

It may also refer to:

Places
Cerro Pajonal, a mountain in the Andes Mountains of Argentina
Gran Pajonal (Great Grassland or Great Savannah), an isolated interfluvial plateau in the Amazon Basin of Peru
El Pajonal, a village and municipality in Catamarca Province in northwestern Argentina
San Antonio Pajonal, a city and municipality in the Santa Ana department of El Salvador

Others
Pajonal Asheninka or Ashéninka language, aka Ashéninca, Ashéninga, the name that some varieties included in the Ashéninka-Asháninka dialect complex have traditionally received, which belongs to the Kampan branch of the Arawak family